In the Name of the Father is a 2006 film by the Iranian director Ebrahim Hatamikia. Hatamikia also wrote the script for the film, which was lensed by Hassan Karimi. Parviz Parastui, Mahtab Nasirpour, Golshifteh Farahani starred in the principal roles.

The film won the Crystal Simorgh for best film at the Fajr Film Festival. Parastui and Nasirpour also won prizes for best actor and best actress respectively.

Plot
The film is about the relationship between a Basiji father and his young  daughter, who were injured by mines left over from the war.

Cast
Parviz Parastui
Golshifteh Farahani as Habibeh
Mahtab Nasirpour as Raheleh
Kambiz  Dirbaz
Mehrdad Ziai
Afshin Hashemi
Mirtaher Mazloumi
Kazem HajirAzad
Shabnam Moghaddami

References

External links
 

Iranian war drama films
2006 films
2000s Persian-language films
Films directed by Ebrahim Hatamikia
Crystal Simorgh for Best Film winners